The 2012 ACC football season is an NCAA football season that will be played from September 1, 2012, to January 1, 2013. The Atlantic Coast Conference consists of 12 members in two divisions. The Atlantic division consists of Boston College, Clemson, Florida State, Maryland, North Carolina State and Wake Forest. The Coastal division consists of Duke, Georgia Tech, Miami, North Carolina, Virginia, and Virginia Tech. The division champions will meet on December 1 in the 2012 ACC Championship Game, at Bank of America Stadium in Charlotte, North Carolina. This season also marks the 60th football season in the conference's history.

Preseason

Preseason Poll
The 2012 ACC Preseason Poll was announced at the ACC Football Kickoff meetings in Greensboro, NC on July 23. Virginia Tech was voted to win Coastal division while Florida State was voted to win the Atlantic division and the conference. Sammy Watkins of Clemson was voted the Preseason ACC Player of the Year.

Atlantic Division poll
 Florida State – 543 (72 first place votes)
 Clemson – 470 (17)
 North Carolina State – 402 (5)
 Wake Forest – 241
 Boston College – 181
 Maryland – 148

Coastal Division poll
 Virginia Tech – 558 (83)
 Georgia Tech – 421 (10)
 North Carolina – 341 (2)
 Virginia – 326
 Miami – 245
 Duke – 04

Predicted ACC Championship Game Winner
 Florida State–60
 Virginia Tech–18
 Clemson–13
 Georgia Tech–3
 NC State-1

Preseason ACC Player of the Year
Sammy Watkins, CLEM - 25
Logan Thomas, VT - 21
E. J. Manuel, FSU - 19
Tajh Boyd, CLEM - 18
Mike Glennon, NCSU - 5
David Amerson, NCSU - 3
Giovani Bernard, UNC - 1
Bryn Renner, UNC - 1
Tanner Price, WF - 1
Kyle Fuller, VT - 1

Preseason All Conference Teams

Offense

Defense

Specialist

Preseason Watch list

Coaches
NOTE: Stats shown are before the beginning of the season

Pre-season Coaches changes

Former Ohio State Offensive Coordinator, Jim Bollman, was hired as Boston College Offensive Line Coach/Running Game Coordinator.
Sean Desai was hired from Miami as Boston College new Running backs coach/Special teams coordinator, Columbia's wide receivers coach Aaron Smith took the same position at Boston College.

Rankings

Schedule

Week One

Week Two

Week Three

Week Four

Week Five

Week Six

Week Seven

Week Eight

Week Nine

Week Ten

Week Eleven

Week Twelve

Week Thirteen

Championship Week

Bowl Games

Weekly Awards
Following each week of games, Atlantic Coast Conference officials select the players of the week from the conference's teams.

Postseason Awards

All-conference teams

First Team

Offense

Defense

Second Team

Offense

Defense

Conferences awards

Defensive Player of the Year: Bjoern Werner, FSU
Defensive Rookie of the Year: Ronald Darby. FSU

Players going pro

References